Ranbir Rano is a Hindi television series produced by Diamond Pictures that aired on Zee TV channel between 22 September 2008 – 28 May 2009. The show was very popular in that time and TRP was 5.9 when it was telecasting in Zee TV. The story summary is: two young souls in search of love, as and a natural view of the Punjab and an unconditional belief in the power of destiny.

Plot 
The story is set in a small town in the Punjab, 'Dera-Bassi'. Ranbir and Rano live in Dera-Bassi, but Rano is from a conservative Punjabi family and hence has limited exposure with the outside world. Her father is the station master of Dera-bassi and it is one day, on her way to 'Dharamsala' that she meets the man who is to become a part of her life – Ranbir.  What transpires after is what dreams are made of – sweet moments between the couple, feuding households, and love that outshines the toughest of all obstacles.

Cast

Main
Vinay Rohrra / Ravi Dubey ... Ranbir (Vinay was the old Ranbir)
Sakshi Talwar ... Rano

Recurring Cast
Achint Kaur ... Preet Bahan-Jee, Ranbir's eldest sister
Deep Dhillon... Ranbir's father
Rajendra Gupta ... Bau-Jee, Rano's Father
Pankaj Berry... Rano's Fouh-jee chacha/uncle
Kunika Lal ... Kamla, Rano's Step mother
Rohit Bharadwaj ...Sukhi, Rano's step brother.
Mihika Verma... Tina, Ranbir's close friend
Tarun Madan ... Vicky

External links
Ranbir Rano Official Site on Zee TV

Indian television soap operas
Zee TV original programming
2008 Indian television series debuts
2009 Indian television series endings